Montuïri is municipality in central Majorca, one of the Balearic Islands, Spain. It is a small town built on a hill. Cyclist Gabriel Mas was born here. It is the birthplace of Macià Manera, ex-member of Terra Lliure imprisoned during the late 1980s and early 1990s.

Photo gallery

References

Municipalities in Mallorca
Populated places in Mallorca